The origin of the Moon is usually explained by a Mars-sized body striking the Earth, making a debris ring that eventually collected into a single natural satellite, the Moon, but there are a number of variations on this giant-impact hypothesis, as well as alternative explanations, and research continues into how the Moon came to be formed.  Other proposed scenarios include captured body, fission, formed together (condensation theory, synestia), planetesimal collisions (formed from asteroid-like bodies), and collision theories.

The standard giant-impact hypothesis suggests that a Mars-sized body, called Theia, impacted the proto-Earth, creating a large debris ring around Earth, which then accreted to form the Moon. This collision also resulted in the 23.5° tilted axis of the Earth, thus causing the seasons. The Moon's oxygen isotopic ratios seem to be essentially identical to Earth's. Oxygen isotopic ratios, which may be measured very precisely, yield a unique and distinct signature for each Solar System body. If Theia had been a separate protoplanet, it probably would have had a different oxygen isotopic signature than proto-Earth, as would the ejected mixed material. Also, the Moon's titanium isotope ratio (50Ti/47Ti) appears so close to the Earth's (within 4 parts per million) that little if any of the colliding body's mass could likely have been part of the Moon.

Formation 

Some theories have been stated that presume the proto-Earth had no large moons early in the formation of the Solar System, 4.425  billion years ago, Earth being basically rock and lava. Theia, an early protoplanet the size of Mars, hit Earth in such a way that it ejected a considerable amount of material away from Earth. Some proportion of these ejecta escaped into space, but the rest consolidated into a single spherical body in orbit about Earth, creating the Moon.

The hypothesis requires a collision between a proto-Earth about 90% of the diameter of present Earth, and another body the diameter of Mars (half of the terrestrial diameter and a tenth of its mass). The latter has sometimes been referred to as Theia, the name of the mother of Selene, the Moon goddess in Greek mythology. This size ratio is needed in order for the resulting system to have sufficient angular momentum to match the current orbital configuration. Such an impact would have put enough material into orbit around Earth to have eventually accumulated to form the Moon.

Computer simulations show a need for a glancing blow, which causes a portion of the collider to form a long arm of material that then shears off. The asymmetrical shape of the Earth following the collision then causes this material to settle into an orbit around the main mass. The energy involved in this collision is impressive: possibly trillions of tonnes of material would have been vaporized and melted.

The Moon's relatively small iron core (compared to other rocky planets and moons in the Solar System) is explained by Theia's core mostly merging into that of Earth. The lack of volatiles in the lunar samples is also explained in part by the energy of the collision. The energy liberated during the reaccretion of material in orbit around Earth would have been sufficient to melt a large portion of the Moon, leading to the generation of a magma ocean.

The newly formed Moon orbited at about one-tenth the distance that it does today, and spiraled outward because of tidal friction transferring angular momentum from the rotations of both bodies to the Moon's orbital motion. Along the way, the Moon's rotation became tidally locked to Earth, so that one side of the Moon continually faces toward Earth. Also, the Moon would have collided with and incorporated any small preexisting satellites of Earth, which would have shared the Earth's composition, including isotopic abundances. The geology of the Moon has since been more independent of the Earth.

A 2012 study on the depletion of zinc isotopes on the Moon found evidence for volatile depletion consistent with the giant-impact origin for Earth and the Moon. In 2013, a study was released that indicated that water in lunar magma is indistinguishable from that in carbonaceous chondrites and nearly the same as that of Earth in isotopic composition.

Derivatives of the hypothesis 
Although the giant-impact hypothesis explains many aspects of the Earth–Moon system, there are still a few unresolved problems, such as the Moon's volatile elements not being as depleted as expected from such an energetic impact.

Another issue is lunar and Earth isotope comparisons. In 2001, the most precise measurement yet of the isotopic signatures of Moon rocks was published. Surprisingly, the Apollo lunar samples carried an isotopic signature identical to Earth rocks, but different from other Solar System bodies. Because most of the material that went into orbit to form the Moon was thought to come from Theia, this observation was unexpected. In 2007, researchers from Caltech showed that the likelihood of Theia having an identical isotopic signature as the Earth is very small (less than 1 percent chance). Published in 2012, an analysis of titanium isotopes in Apollo lunar samples showed that the Moon has the same composition as Earth, which conflicts with the Moon forming far from Earth's orbit.

Merger of two planets 
To help resolve these problems, a new theory published in 2012 posits that two bodies—each five times the size of Mars—collided, then recollided, forming a large disc of mixed debris that eventually formed Earth and the Moon. The paper was called “Forming a Moon with an Earth-like composition via a Giant Impact”, by R. M. Canup.

Immediate origin of the Moon as a post-impact satellite 

The Moon is traditionally thought to have coalesced from the debris ejected by a giant impact onto the early Earth. However, such models struggle to explain the similar isotopic compositions of Earth and lunar rocks at the same time as the system's angular momentum, and the details of potential impact scenarios are hotly debated. Above a high resolution threshold for simulations, a study published in 2022 finds that giant impacts can immediately place a satellite with similar mass and iron content to the Moon into orbit far outside Earth's Roche limit. Even satellites that initially pass within the Roche limit can reliably and predictably survive, by being partially stripped and then torqued onto wider, stable orbits. Furthermore, the outer layers of these directly formed satellites are molten over cooler interiors and are composed of around 60% proto-Earth material. This could alleviate the tension between the Moon's Earth-like isotopic composition and the different signature expected for the impactor. Immediate formation opens up new options for the Moon's early orbit and evolution, including the possibility of a highly tilted orbit to explain the lunar inclination, and offers a simpler, single-stage scenario for the origin of the Moon.

Multiple impacts 
In 2004, astrophysicist Nikolai Gorkavyi proposed a novel model (multiple large asteroid impacts model). In 2013, the model was supported by a group of Russian astronomers and later, in 2017, by planetary researchers at Weizmann Institute of Science in Rehovot, Israel. In general terms, the main idea of the model suggests that the Moon was formed as a result of a violent rain of large asteroids (1–100 km) that repeatedly hammered the fledgling Earth over millions of years. A series of smaller impacts, which were likely more common in the early Solar System, could blast enough Earth rocks and dirt into orbit to form a protosatellite disk which later forms into a small moonlet. As repeated impacts created more balls of debris, the moonlets could merge over time into one large moon.

Synestia hypothesis 
In 2018 researchers at Harvard and the UC Davis developed computer models demonstrating that one possible outcome of a planetary collision is that it creates a synestia, a mass of vaporized rock and metal which forms a biconcave disc extending beyond the lunar orbit. The synestia will eventually shrink and cool to accrete the satellite and reform the impacted planet.

Other hypotheses

Capture 
This hypothesis states that the Moon was captured by the Earth. This model was popular until the 1980s, and some points in its favor are the Moon's size, orbit, and tidal locking.

One problem is understanding the capture mechanism. A close encounter of two planetary bodies typically results in either collision or altered trajectories. For this hypothesis to work, there might have been a large atmosphere around the primitive Earth, which would slow the movement of the Moon by aerobraking before it could escape. That hypothesis may also explain the irregular satellite orbits of Jupiter and Saturn. However, this hypothesis does not adequately explain the essentially identical oxygen isotope ratios of the two bodies.

Fission
This is the now discredited hypothesis that an ancient, rapidly spinning Earth expelled a piece of its mass.  This was proposed by George Darwin (son of the famous biologist Charles Darwin) in 1879 and retained some popularity until Apollo. The Austrian geologist Otto Ampferer in 1925 also suggested the emerging of the Moon as cause for continental drift.

It was proposed that the Pacific Ocean represented the scar of this event. Today it is known that the oceanic crust that makes up this ocean basin is relatively young, about 200 million years old or less, whereas the Moon is much older. The Moon does not consist of oceanic crust but of mantle material, which originated inside the proto-Earth in the Precambrian.

Accretion
The hypothesis of accretion suggests that the Earth and the Moon formed together as a double system from the primordial accretion disk of the Solar System or even a black hole.
The problem with this hypothesis is that it does not explain the angular momentum of the Earth-Moon system or why the Moon has a relatively small iron core compared to the Earth (25% of its radius compared to 50% for the Earth).

Nuclear explosion
Dutch scientists Rob de Meijer and Wim van Westrenen suggested in 2010 that the Moon may have formed from a nuclear explosion caused by the centrifugal force of an earlier, spinning proto-Earth. The centrifugal force would have concentrated heavy elements such as thorium and uranium on the equatorial plane and at the boundary between the Earth's outer core and mantle. If the concentrations of these radioactive elements were high enough, this could have led to a nuclear chain reaction that became supercritical, causing a nuclear explosion ejecting the Moon into orbit. This natural nuclear fission reactor has been observed on Earth at a much smaller scale.

Additional theories and studies

2011
In 2011, it was theorized that a second moon existed 4.5 billion years ago, and later had an impact with the Moon, as a part of the accretion process in the formation of the Moon.

2013
One hypothesis, presented only as a possibility, was that the Earth captured the Moon from Venus.

2017
Uranium–lead dating of Apollo 14 zircon fragments shows the age of the Moon to be about 4.51 billion years.

2020
A team of researchers of the Miniature Radio Frequency (Mini-RF) instrument on NASA's Lunar Reconnaissance Orbiter (LRO) spacecraft concluded that the Moon's subsurface may be richer in metals, like iron and titanium, more than scientists had believed.

In July 2020 scientists report that the Moon formed 4.425 ±0.025 bya, about 85 million years earlier than thought, and that it hosted an ocean of magma for substantially longer than previously thought (for ~200 million years).

See also
 
 
 
 
 
  (Lunar lander proposal)
 Spaceship Moon, a non-scientific hypothesis of the Moon's origin
 Phaeton, another non-scientific hypothesis of the Moon's origin
Magma Ocean, general description of magma oceans and their formation

References

External links
Lunar formation Case Western Reserve University
The Once and Future Moon (September 28, 2012) 
Nature - Moon-forming impact theory rescued

Moon
Articles containing video clips
Moon
Pre-Nectarian